Xanalılar or Xanalı or Xanali or Khanali may refer to:

Xanalı, a village in the Shusha District of Azerbaijan
Xanalılar, a village in the Lachin District of Azerbaijan